Got to Be Tough is a studio album by Jamaican reggae band Toots and the Maytals. It was released through Trojan Jamaica/BMG on 28 August 2020 and financed by Trojan Jamaica owner Zak Starkey, who also played guitar for the recording. The album is the first studio release from Toots and the Maytals in more than a decade and the first after an accident wherein bandleader Toots Hibbert was hit in the head with a glass bottle, leading to his hiatus from performing. The lyrical content of the album is political, featuring pleas for unity among people.

Got to Be Tough was the band's final studio release before Hibbert's death on 11 September 2020 due to complications from COVID-19. After his death, the album won the Grammy Award for Best Reggae Album at the 63rd Annual Grammy Awards.

Critical reception 

Got to Be Tough was met with generally positive reviews. At Metacritic, which assigns a normalized rating out of 100 to reviews from professional critics, the album received an average score of 74, based on 10 reviews. Reviewing in his Substack-published "Consumer Guide" column, Robert Christgau said, "What I like about these [songs], and Starkey must have too, is how conscious they are. Having long favored danceable love songs, [Hibbert] spends most [of] these 36 minutes looking time tough in its ugly face. 'Just Brutal,' 'Warning Warning,' and 'Got to Be Tough'; bus fares, low wages, invisible pensions, and picking yourself up off the ground. But he's also proud to stand accused for feeding his enemies." Tom Dibb from Gigwise wrote that the album "calls the world to task, and has them dancing all the while", describing it as "politically minded, brutally honest but maintaining the heartfelt and soulful nature of rocksteady and ska". Variety magazine's Steve Bloom also applauded Hibbert's messages of optimism on songs that "alternate between reggae and R&B".

Track listing

Personnel
 Producer: Frederick "Toots" Hibbert
 Co-producers: Nigel Burrell,  Zak Starkey, Martin "Youth" Glover

Other - credits taken from AllMusic:
 Nigel Burrell – drum programming, engineer, harmony
 Tomas Crow – engineer
 Lisa Davis – harmony
 Sly Dunbar – drums
 Latoya Hall-Downer – harmony
 Carl Harvey – guitar
 Frederick "Toots" Hibbert – bass, composer, drums, guitar, harmony, keyboards, vocals
 Leba Hibbert – harmony
 Stewart Hurwood – guitar technician
 Sharna Liguz – cover art concept
 Gavin Lurssen – mastering
 Bob Marley – composer
 Ziggy Marley – featured artist, vocals
 Dario Morgan – guitar
 Cyril Neville – percussion
 Max Noise – engineer
 Conrad Pinnock – saxophone
 Delroy "Fatta" Pottinger – engineer
 Michael Rendall – engineer
 Dwight Richards – trumpet
 Nambo Robinson – trombone
 Dave Sardy – mixing
 Sheldon Palmer – saxophone
 Sshh – editing
 Zak Starkey – editing, guitar
 Ringo Starr – tambourine
 Steven Stewart – keyboards
 Bruce Sugar – engineer
 Toots & the Maytals – primary artist
 Twiggy – harmony
 Dale Voelker – design, illustrations
 Hopeton Williams – trumpet

References

External links 
 

2020 albums
Grammy Award for Best Reggae Album
Toots and the Maytals albums